The legislative districts of Makati are the representations of the highly urbanized city of Makati in the various national legislatures of the Philippines. The city is currently represented in the lower house of the Congress of the Philippines through its first and second districts.

History 

Areas now under the jurisdiction of Makati were initially represented as part of the at-large district of the province of Manila in the Malolos Congress from 1898 to 1899. The then-town was later incorporated to the province of Rizal, established in 1901, and was represented as part of the first district of Rizal from 1907 to 1941 and from 1945 to 1972. Then excluding the present-day Embo barangays and barangay Rizal, Makati was incorporated to the City of Greater Manila during World War II and was represented as part of the at-large district of Manila from 1943 to 1944. Areas now under the jurisdiction of the aforementioned barangays, meanwhile, was part of the at-large district of Rizal during the war-time legislature. Makati was separated from Rizal on November 7, 1975 by virtue of Presidential Decree No. 824, and was represented in the Interim Batasang Pambansa along with other Metropolitan Manila municipalities and cities as part of Region IV from 1978 to 1984.

Makati first gained separate representation in 1984, when it returned one representative to the Regular Batasang Pambansa. The municipality continued to constitute a separate congressional district under the new Constitution proclaimed on February 11, 1987; it elected its member to the restored House of Representatives starting that same year.

Upon its cityhood, Makati was divided into two congressional districts by virtue of Section 52 of Republic Act No. 7854 (the City Charter of Makati), enacted on January 2, 1995 and approved by plebiscite on February 4, 1995, the day Makati became a city. The districts first elected their separate representatives in the 1998 general elections.

There remains an unresolved dispute over which city has jurisdiction over lands encompassed within the former Fort McKinley U.S. Military Reservation (now Fort Bonifacio and its surrounding areas). Portions of two of Makati's barangays (Post Proper Northside and Post Proper Southside) are claimed by the neighboring city of Taguig as part of its own four barangays (Fort Bonifacio, Pinagsama, Western Bicutan, and Ususan). Residents of areas where Makati exercises de facto control vote as part of this  congressional district, while residents of areas where Taguig exercises de facto control vote as part of its first congressional district for Ususan and its second congressional district for Fort Bonifacio, Pinagsama, and Western Bicutan.

Historical and defunct district boundaries

Historical representatives

Current districts and representatives 
The city was last redistricted in 1998, wherein the city gained a second seat in the House of Representatives.  

Political parties

Notes

References 

Makati
Makati
Politics of Makati